Yuracjaja (possibly from Quechua yuraq white, qaqa rock, "white rock") is mountain in the northern extensions of the Vilcanota mountain range in the Andes of Peru, about  high. It is located in the Cusco Region, Quispicanchi Province,  Ocongate District. Yuracjaja lies southwest of Jolljepunco and Cinajara where the annual Quyllur Rit'i festival takes place and southeast of Condorsenja and Jajachaca. Vilacirca is in the east beyond the Cinajara valley.

References 

Mountains of Cusco Region
Mountains of Peru